List of NASCAR champions could refer to:

List of NASCAR Cup Series champions
List of NASCAR Xfinity Series champions
List of NASCAR Truck Series champions
List of ARCA Menards Series champions
List of ARCA Menards Series East champions
List of ARCA Menards Series West champions
List of NASCAR Pinty's Series champions
List of NASCAR Whelen Euro Series champions
List of NASCAR Whelen Modified Tour champions
List of NASCAR Whelen Southern Modified Tour champions
List of NASCAR Whelen All-American Series national champions